Arachnoid granulations (also arachnoid villi, and pacchionian granulations or bodies) are small protrusions of the arachnoid mater (the thin second layer covering the brain) into the outer membrane of the dura mater (the thick outer layer). They protrude into the dural venous sinuses of the brain, and allow cerebrospinal fluid (CSF) to exit the subarachnoid space and enter the blood stream.

The largest granulations lie along the superior sagittal sinus, a large venous space running from front to back along the center of the head (on the inside of the skull). They are, however, present along other dural sinuses as well.

Function
Diffusion across the arachnoid granulations into the superior sagittal sinus returns CSF to the venous circulation.

The arachnoid granulations act as one-way valves. Normally the pressure of the CSF is higher than that of the venous system, so CSF flows through the villi and granulations into the blood. If the pressure is reversed for some reason, fluid will not pass back into the subarachnoid space. The reason for this is not known. It has been suggested that the endothelial cells of the venous sinus create vacuoles of CSF, which move through the cell and out into the blood.

The importance of arachnoid granulations for the drainage of CSF is controversial.  By some accounts, a large portion (perhaps the majority) of CSF is drained through lymphatics associated with extracranial segments of the cranial nerves.  A large proportion of CSF is believed to leave the cranial vault through the axons of CN I (olfactory nerve) through their extension through the cribriform plate.

On the inner surface of cranial bones, small pits called granular fovea are produced by arachnoid granulations.

Eponym
Occasionally, they are referred to by their old name: Pacchioni's granulations or pacchionian bodies, named after Italian anatomist Antonio Pacchioni.

References

Additional images

Meninges